Echinodillo is a genus of woodlice in the family Armadillidae. It contains two species.

Species

E. cavaticus

Echinodillo cavaticus Green, 1963, the Flinders Island cave slater, is endemic to caves on Flinders Island, Tasmania. It is listed as data deficient on the IUCN Red List.

E. montanus
Echinodillo montanus Jackson, 1935 is endemic to the Marquesas Islands.

References

Woodlice
Taxonomy articles created by Polbot